Molly White (born 1993) is an American software engineer, Wikipedia editor, and crypto skeptic. A critic of the decentralized blockchain (Web3) and cryptocurrency industries, her website, Web3 Is Going Just Great, documents malfeasance in that technology space. She has appeared in Web3-related news, consulted on federal legislation for regulating the crypto industry, and successfully proposed that the Wikimedia Foundation cease to collect crypto donations. White additionally volunteers as a Wikipedia editor and is among the site's most active women. She has edited a range of articles on controversial topics concerning right-wing extremism.

Wikipedia editing 

White began editing Wikipedia at the age of 13, and became a site administrator while still in high school. Initially, White wrote articles about her favorite emo bands and women scientists, but came to write about right-wing extremismsuch as Gamergate, the Boogaloo movement, Gab, Parler, and Jacob Wohlduring the Donald Trump administration. She received mainstream news coverage for her work editing the article about the January 6 United States Capitol attack. Under the username "GorillaWarfare", she has made over 100,000 edits as of early 2022. This work, she said, fulfills her interest in validating information online and her belief that spreading information produces societal change. She served six years on the English Wikipedia's Arbitration Committee, which adjudicates editor disputes.

As one of Wikipedia's most active female editors, White has been a regular target of online harassment, threats of violence, doxxing, and hounding both on Wikipedia and off-site. Her experience was the subject of a 2016 speech on editor harassment by Wikimedia Foundation CEO Katherine Maher. White had previously been targeted after her photograph featured in a Foundation fundraising campaign. The harassment escalated in 2018 after she began editing Wikipedia articles on incels and other contentious topics.

Cryptocurrency criticism 

In late 2021, White noticed a public tone shift around cryptocurrencies with a push to take crypto mainstream as a default technology. This grew her concerns for the suitability of cryptocurrency in general, based on the performance of past projects. In her research, she started the Wikipedia article on Web3, an idea for a Web based on decentralized blockchains. Despite the concept's hype on social media with sizable venture capital investment, she found the term to be ill-defined and associated with numerous scams, frauds, and "rug pulls" affecting consumer investors. She created a website, Web3 Is Going Just Great, in December 2021 to document these cases. The website provides a timeline of Web3 and cryptocurrency projects and the losses to their investors. Many of its stories are not covered in the mainstream press, and unlike press coverage of Web3, its headlines are unsensational. The Verge described her writing as "dryly funny, almost clinical" in its documentation. A running total of dollars lost to crypto failures runs in the website's corner. The site also includes a glossary of jargon, curated resources about the blockchain, and an annotated critique of Kevin Roose's New York Times article, "The Latecomer's Guide to Crypto", which she considered a "grossly irresponsible" advertisement for cryptocurrencies. The website's traffic grew quickly after it was listed on Hacker News, Reddit, and multiple news publications, growing to 60,000 and 100,000 monthly visitors by the end of the year. During this time, she worked for several hours a day on the blog.

By mid-2022, White was known among the most prominent and knowledgeable critics of the crypto and Web3 industries. On those topics, White lectured at Stanford University, counseled U.S. Senator Sheldon Whitehouse on legislation, and provided fact checks for inquiring journalists. Her appearances on Web3-related news sites, podcasts, and technology mailing lists made her into an "unofficial Web3 ombudsperson", according to The Information. She has a large following among cryptocurrency skeptics and, in late 2022, was recognized among both Forbes's "30 Under 30" people in Social Media and Prospect list of the world's top thinkers.

White's Twitter thread on flaws in the proposed cryptocurrency project Cryptoland went viral and led to large-scale ridicule of the now-inactive project. In early 2022, she proposed that the Wikimedia Foundation cease accepting cryptocurrency donations, which she argued were associated with predatory technologies and no longer ethical. Following a community vote with majority support among participating Wikipedia editors, the Foundation adopted her proposal in May 2022. She also sees privacy and harassment implications with having an individual's entire transaction history permanently available and accessible to the public via blockchain, and has been surprised by how few companies consider vectors for abuse. According to White, "Any time you're talking about taking user-generated content and putting it into immutable storage, you're going to have really serious problems." She holds that crypto has not democratized the web but has exacerbated inequalities, stating that Web3 technologies have actually re-centralized power under the control of a few wealthy investors, many of whom are already very influential in shaping the current web tech landscape, according to White. She also says that positive use cases for the technology have largely consisted of situations in which "any replacement is better than what exists", such as sending funds to people struggling to live in sanctioned states.

White has called for federal regulation of the crypto industry. She signed a June 2022 letter to the U.S. Congress with 25 other technologists urging regulation. The letter states, in part, that blockchain technology is "poorly suited for just about every purpose currently touted as a present or potential source of public benefit." White opposed a cryptocurrency regulatory proposal by Senators Kirsten Gillibrand and Cynthia Lummis for its leniency on the industry. Cryptocurrencies are treated as consumer investments, more like a security than a commodity, she argued, and should be handled by the U.S. Securities and Exchange Commission, not the Commodity Futures Trading Commission.

Following the collapse of cryptocurrency exchange FTX in late 2022, mainstream reporting grew more critical of crypto projects, but White continued see substantial interest in her site into 2023 to continue with it. As the tech industry shifted from blockchain to artificial intelligence as its next favorable trend, White held these cycles of hype required responsible coverage from journalists who probe how a technology works in practice and challenge how its proponents claim the technology works.

Personal life and career 

White was born in 1993 and raised in Maine. While attending Camden Hills Regional High School in Rockport, White interned at a NASA-funded University of Maine lab that researched lunar habitat module sensors. She attended Boston's Northeastern University, where she participated in two co-ops with the marketing software developer HubSpot. After graduating with a bachelor's degree in computer science in 2016, she continued to work there as a software engineer for six years, through May 2022, when she resigned to recover from burnout. As of late 2022, she is an affiliate of Harvard University's Berkman Klein Center for Internet & Society.

White lives in the Greater Boston area. She holds left-wing views that skew towards socialism. Her side projects have included helping an open source court stenography project and building remotely controlled robotic toys for her fostered kittens.

See also 

Cryptocurrency bubble
List of Wikipedia people

References

External links 

 
 Web3 Is Going Just Great
 

1993 births
Living people
21st-century American engineers
21st-century American women
American bloggers
American software engineers
American women bloggers
American women critics
American women editors
American women engineers
Northeastern University alumni
People associated with cryptocurrency
Wikipedia people
Writers from Massachusetts